Zoo Station may refer to:

Transportation
Berlin Zoologischer Garten railway station, a rail station in Berlin, Germany
Taipei Zoo Station, a metro station in Taipei, Taiwan
Taipei Zoo South Station, a cable car station in Taipei, Taiwan
Zoo station (Calgary), a light rail station in Calgary, Alberta, Canada 
Beijing Zoo Station, a metro station in Beijing, China
Zoo station (Guangzhou Metro), a metro station in Guangzhou, China
Zoo station (Chongqing Rail Transit), a metro station in Chongqing, China
Zoological Garden station, a former rail station in Philadelphia, USA

Other uses
"Zoo Station" (song), a 1991 song by U2
Zoo Station, a 2007 novel by David Downing named after the Berlin railway station

See also
 Botanical Garden station (disambiguation)
 Kew Gardens station (disambiguation)